The La Crosse Armory building is an armory building located in La Crosse, Wisconsin. It was used as a Wisconsin Army National Guard center after World War I starting in 1921. In 1960 the drilling location was moved to Onalaska, Wisconsin.

See also 

 The Freight House
 Historic Downtown La Crosse
 Gund Brewery Lofts

References 

National Register of Historic Places in La Crosse County, Wisconsin
Buildings and structures in La Crosse County, Wisconsin
Armories in Wisconsin
1902 establishments in Wisconsin
Buildings and structures completed in 1902